Alfred Henry Evans (14 June 1858 – 26 March 1934) was an English first-class cricketer. He was a right-handed batsman who bowled right-arm fast-medium.

Early life
Evans was the son of Deputy-Surgeon-General Evans, M.D., formerly Inspector-General of Hospitals in Madras. Evans was educated at Rossall School, before moving to Clifton College where he represented the college cricket team from 1875 to 1877. Later, Evans was educated at Oriel College, Oxford.

Early career
Evans made his first-class debut for the Oxford University against the Gentlemen of England in 1878. In Evans' second match for the university against the Marylebone Cricket Club he took his maiden five-wicket haul of 6/39. A few matches later against Cambridge University Evans took 5/55 in Cambridge Universities first innings and 7/86 in the Universities second innings to give him maiden ten wicket haul in a match. Evans played four matches for Oxford University in 1878.

In the same season Evans made his debut for the Gentlemen in the annual Gentlemen v Players, the gentlemen side featured W.G. Grace. Also in 1878, Evans made his debut for the Gentlemen of England against the touring Australians.

In 1879 Evans represented Oxford University in four first-class matches, as well as representing the Gentlemen in two Gentlemen v Players fixtures. Also during the 1879 season, Evans played a single first-class match for I Zingari against Yorkshire and a single match for the Gentlemen of the North v Gentlemen of the South, where Evans represented the South. In the 1879 season Evans took 41 wickets at a bowling average of 12.09, with five five wicket hauls and two ten wicket hauls in a match. Evans best bowling figures were 7/31.

In 1880 Evans represented an England XI against R Daft's American XI, where Evans took 9/59 in R Daft's American XI's first innings. From 1880 to 1881 Evans represented Oxford University in ten more first-class matches, with his final match for the university coming against Cambridge University in 1881. In his eighteen first-class matches for the university, Evans scored 348 runs at a batting average of 11.22 and a high score of 49. With the ball Evans took 107 wickets at a bowling average of 15.21, with thirteen five wicket hauls, four ten wicket hauls in a match and best bowling figures of 7/74. Evans captained the university in 1881 and was awarded his Oxford Blue in the same year.

In 1881 Evans made his debut for the Marylebone Cricket Club against the touring Australians. The same season Evans made his debut for Somerset against Lancashire. From 1882 to 1884 Evans represented Somerset in six first-class matches, with his final appearance for the county coming against Hampshire. Evans scored 212 runs at a batting average of 23.55, with two half centuries and a high score of 59*. With the ball Evans took 26 wickets at a bowling average of 22.00, with two five wicket hauls and best figures of 6-75.

In 1882 Evans played two more first-class matches for I Zingari against the touring Australians and Yorkshire.

Later career
In 1885 Evans made his debut for Hampshire against Sussex. Evans played two more first-class matches for Hampshire in 1885 against Derbyshire and Kent. In his three matches for Hampshire, Evans took 10 wickets at a bowling average of 17.80, with best figures of 4/47.

In 1885 Evans played his final match for I Zingari against the Gentlemen of England. Evans also played his final first-class match for the Gentlemen in the 1885 Gentlemen v Players fixture. Evans played seven first-class matches for the Gentlemen, taking 39 wickets at a bowling average of 9.35, with four five wicket hauls and one ten wicket haul in a match and best figures of 7/31. Evans final first-class match came in 1885 for the Marylebone Cricket Club against Yorkshire.

In Evans overall first-class career he played 44 matches, scoring 908 runs at a batting average of 13.75, with three half centuries and a high score of 59*. Evans took 204 wickets at a bowling average of 16.08, with twenty five wicket hauls and six ten wicket hauls and best figures of 9/59 which came for an England XI against R Daft's American XI in 1880.

After cricket
From January 1882 until April 1888 Evans was the assistant master at Winchester College. Later Evans became headmaster of Horris Hill School at Newbury, Berkshire, a position he held from 1888 to 1920.

Evans died at Saunton, Devon on 26 March 1934.

Family
Evans' sons John and Ralph both played first-class cricket, John captaining Kent in 1927 and playing one Test match for England in 1921. His nephews, Dudley, William and Alfred also all played first-class cricket.

References

External links

1858 births
1934 deaths
Cricketers from Chennai
People educated at Rossall School
People educated at Clifton College
Alumni of Oriel College, Oxford
English cricketers
Oxford University cricketers
Gentlemen cricketers
Marylebone Cricket Club cricketers
Somerset cricketers
Hampshire cricketers
Schoolteachers from Berkshire
I Zingari cricketers
Gentlemen of the South cricketers
Gentlemen of England cricketers
19th-century sportsmen
Heads of schools in England
English cricketers of 1864 to 1889